"Turn Left at Mount Everest" was an American television play broadcast on April 3, 1958, as part of the second season of the CBS television series Playhouse 90. Del Reisman wrote the teleplay, as an adaptation of a stage play by Lowell Barrington. Peter Lorre and Fess Parker starred.

Plot
A comedy in which Private Linus Powell (Fess Parker) stows away on a B-17 flying from China across the Himalayas at the end of World War II to reunite with his British girlfriend in Calcutta. While Powell sleeps, the crew bails out out in a monsoon, and Powell is left behind with a half-loaded Asian man played by Peter Lorre, who tries to guide Powell over the Himalayas.

Reception
Television critic William Ewald described it as "a pretty peculiar stab" at light comedy. While he found some scenes that "almost made it", he concluded that the production "as a whole ... didn't have it. Its situation and characters were only mildly amusing and its dialogue lacked sustained spark."

Critic Hope Strong wrote that the production aspired to be "deliciously droll" but ended up with "drizzly drivel."

Another critic, Fred Remington, was amused by the production, writing that Fess Parker "just plays himself, and a very agreeable, entertaining self it is."

Cast
The following performers received screen credit for their performances:

 Peter Lorre - Tenzing
 Fess Parker - Pvt. Linus Powell
 Patricia Cutts - Sally Gates
 Paul Ford - Colonel
 Arnold Stang - Allencamp

References

1958 television plays
1958 American television episodes
Playhouse 90 (season 2) episodes